Barry Lee Fairchild (March 5, 1954 in Little Rock, Arkansas – August 31, 1995) was an American convicted kidnapper, rapist, and murderer.

Case
Fairchild was arrested for the February 26, 1983 kidnapping, rape, and murder of Marjorie "Greta" Mason, a 22-year-old United States Air Force nurse, after police received information from a confidential informant implicating Fairchild and his brother. At trial, he recanted his two videotaped confessions, claiming that Pulaski County Sheriff Tommy F. Robinson and Chief Deputy Larry Dill had beaten and threatened to kill him unless he confessed, then rehearsed him before the second confession was taped. His attorneys claimed that Fairchild was mentally retarded and did not have the capacity to know right from wrong.  He was convicted on August 2, 1983, and sentenced to death.

In 1993, the United States District Court for the Eastern District of Arkansas ruled the state had failed to prove that Fairchild had killed Mason, and ordered his sentence commuted to life without parole.  The United States Court of Appeals for the Eighth Circuit reversed the District Court in 1994. In 1995 a federal judge found that Fairchild had not been the shooter, but he was executed on August 31 at the Varner Unit near Grady after the United States Supreme Court refused to hear a final appeal, because of "abuse of the writ", since  Fairchild had already petitioned for habeas corpus. Fairchild was executed by lethal injection on August 31, 1995.

See also

 Capital punishment in Arkansas
 Capital punishment in the United States
 List of people executed in Arkansas

Notes
 Death Penalty Information Center

References

External links
 Crime Library
 Opinion of U.S. 8th Circuit Court of Appeals re: Fairchild's Writ of Habeas Corpus

1954 births
1995 deaths
1983 murders in the United States
American people executed for murder
People from Little Rock, Arkansas
People convicted of murder by Arkansas
People executed by Arkansas by lethal injection
Executed people from Arkansas
20th-century executions by Arkansas
20th-century executions of American people